Sino-Tibetan or Chinese-Tibetan can refer to:
 Sino-Tibetan languages, a major language family of East and Southeast Asia, and of northern and northeastern South Asia.
 In comparative linguistics, any or all of the peoples speaking these languages.
 Relations between Tibet and China proper.
Sino-Tibetan art with a Tibetan style and iconography, but usually produced in China under Imperial sponsorship
Sino-Tibetan War; there have been several